The New York Raiders were an ice hockey team in New York City, and founding member of the World Hockey Association. Intended to be the WHA's flagship franchise, the team was unable to compete with the National Hockey League's established New York Rangers, and expansion New York Islanders. During its inaugural season, the WHA had to take over ownership of the team. A third owner took over and renamed the franchise the New York Golden Blades to start the second season, but remained in financial distress and moved to the Greater Philadelphia metropolitan area township of Cherry Hill, New Jersey, on November 21, 1973, becoming the Jersey Knights, its third name and second home, under three different ownership arrangements, in less than two full seasons of operation.

New York Raiders

Coached by Camille Henry, the New York Raiders had the second overall pick in the first WHA Draft in 1972, selecting Al Sims, who signed with the Boston Bruins instead.

The team was initially slated to play in the brand-new Nassau Veterans Memorial Coliseum on Long Island, but Nassau County retained William Shea to get an NHL team to play in the new building. The NHL responded by hastily awarding a franchise to Long Island, the New York Islanders, whose lease with the Coliseum was designed to effectively lock out non-NHL teams.

For the 1972–73 season, the Raiders elected to play in Madison Square Garden, as tenants to their business rival, the New York Rangers. The situation rapidly became untenable, with an onerous lease and low attendance. During the season the Raiders averaged 5,868 spectators per game, which was far less than the NHL's Rangers (17,494) and the Islanders (11,996). The three original owners defaulted, and the league ended up taking control of the team midway through the season.

New York Golden Blades/Jersey Knights

Following the season, New York real estate mogul Ralph Brent bought the team and renamed it the New York Golden Blades. While they managed to acquire Andre Lacroix from the Philadelphia Blazers, he was essentially all the franchise had going for it. The team replaced their original orange and blue uniforms with purple and gold uniforms of a unique design, and to coincide with the new identity, the team started the season wearing white skates with gold-colored blades.

The situation improved very little from the previous season; at times, the Golden Blades played before crowds of only 500 people (in an 18,000-seat arena). Sinking in debt, Brent surrendered the team to the league in late November, just twenty games into the season, with a 6-12-2 record. Veteran player Harry Howell, who had been recently picked up by the Golden Blades after being released from the Los Angeles Kings, was elevated to player-coach, and ordered the team's white skates painted black.

On November 21, 1973, the WHA moved the team to the Greater Philadelphia metropolitan area township of Cherry Hill, New Jersey, and renamed it the Jersey Knights. WHA trustee Howard Baldwin was quoted as saying "Hopefully, we will be back in New York next season with a strong owner to compete in that market," but the WHA would never return to New York, getting no closer than the New England Whalers in 1975, when that team moved from Boston to Hartford, Connecticut. Having been locked out of Madison Square Garden just prior to their move, the players were unable to take their Blades jerseys with them, so the team reverted to the previous Raiders uniforms, with the original crest replaced with the new Knights logo.

The newly minted Knights soon discovered their new home, Cherry Hill Arena, had a slope in the ice surface, which forced visiting teams to skate uphill two out of three periods. One drawback was that pucks would sometimes shoot upwards unexpectedly; one Knight was knocked cold when a would-be pass jumped up and nailed him between the eyes. Years later Ab McDonald said, "[The ice] was so high in the middle, the short guys almost couldn’t see the other end of the ice." The arena in Cherry Hill was available because the previous pro hockey tenant, the Jersey Devils, had folded when the Eastern Hockey League went out of business at the end of the previous season. 

The arena was also closely cramped, with players not having adequate changing and dressing facilities; visiting teams had to dress at their hotel. In addition, there was no plexiglass around the playing surface. The boards in the area from face-off circle to face-off circle at each end of the ice was bordered with chicken-wire as protection. The rest of the arena had no protection above the boards.

Rod Philips, who did radio games for the Edmonton Oilers for 37 years, ending in 2011, is quoted as saying of the Arena, "The press box in Cherry Hill, N.J. (across the bridge from Philadelphia) was so small that you couldn't stand up. The roof was only four feet high and you were all hunched over. When somebody shut the door, they cut off one whole end of the rink."

Despite the questionable facilities, the Knights played over-.500 hockey and were in playoff contention before losing their last six games to finish 32–42–4, last in the Eastern Division. Within five weeks of the move, though, reports had already begun to state that the franchise would not stay in New Jersey beyond the end of the season, as it was clear Cherry Hill Arena was inadequate even for short term use. Moreover, what little local interest existed in the WHA team disappeared with the nearby Philadelphia Flyers en route to their first of two consecutive Stanley Cup championships.

Baltimore businessman Joe Schwartz purchased the team in January, fueling speculation the team might move to the Maryland city, or perhaps be re-incarnated as an expansion franchise in Cincinnati or Indianapolis.

Instead, at the end of the 1974 season, Schwartz moved the Knights to San Diego, California, and renamed them the San Diego Mariners.

The last active player from the Raiders/Golden Blades/Knights was Bobby Sheehan who last played in 1981–82 NHL season and played his final professional season in the American Hockey League in 1983.

Season-by-season record
Note: GP = Games played, W = Wins, L = Losses, T = Ties, Pts = Points, GF = Goals for, GA = Goals against, PIM = Penalties in minutes

References

External links
 WHAhockey.com - NY Raiders

Raiders/Golden Blades/Knights WHA franchise
World Hockey Association teams
Ice hockey clubs established in 1972
Ice hockey clubs disestablished in 1974
Ice hockey teams in New York (state)
1972 establishments in New York City
1974 disestablishments in New Jersey